Hong Myung-bo (Hanja: 洪明甫; ; born 12 February 1969) is a South Korean former footballer who played as a sweeper, and the current head coach of Ulsan Hyundai. Hong is often considered one of the greatest Asian footballers of all time.

Hong was a member of the South Korean national team in four FIFA World Cups, and was the first Asian player to play in four consecutive World Cup final tournaments. He is also the first Asian player ever to receive the Bronze Ball at the World Cup. He gained attention after showing his outstanding ability in World Cup and Asian competitions. He received some votes in elections for the FIFA World Player of the Year, finishing 21st in 1996 and 17th in 2002. Furthermore, he was also selected for the FIFA 100, Pelé's selection about the 125 greatest living footballers in the world.

International career

1990 World Cup 
Hong was named in South Korea's squad for the 1990 FIFA World Cup just four months after his international debut. The youngest South Korean player to participate in the tournament, Hong played all of the three matches in the group stage and received the most praise in South Korea despite losing all group matches.

1994 World Cup 
Hong was selected as a member of South Korean Universiade team in 1991. He stabilized South Korea's defense, helping them advance to the final. He scored South Korea's first penalty in the shoot-out after South Korea drew the final with the Netherlands without a goal during 120 minutes. Hong and South Korea won a gold medal by defeating the Netherlands on penalties.

Hong's talent began to receive attention in earnest since the 1994 FIFA World Cup. When South Korea had only five minutes to catch up Spain, which was leading the match with the score of 2–0, he scored South Korea's first goal outside the penalty area, and assisted his teammate Seo Jung-won to score the equaliser shortly after his goal. While South Korea was losing to defending champions Germany by conceding three goals in the first half, Hong scored one of South Korea's two goals in the second half with a long-range shot to escape defeat.

1998 World Cup 
Hong participated in the 1994 Asian Games after the World Cup, but he injured his knee during the quarter-final match against Japan. South Korea lost to Uzbekistan in the semi-finals after he quit the tournament.

While Park Jong-hwan managed South Korean national team, Hong was in conflict with Park who had a coercive disposition, and was criticized for forming his faction in the team. He was also doubted whether he played the game lazily after South Korea lost 6–2 to Iran in the quarter-finals of the 1996 AFC Asian Cup.

Under the next manager Cha Bum-kun, South Korea recorded one draw and two defeats including a 5–0 loss to the Netherlands in the group stage of the 1998 FIFA World Cup. Hong also failed to prevent South Korea's elimination in the group stage.

2002 World Cup 
Hong was going to be selected as an over-aged player of South Korean under-23 team for the 2000 Summer Olympics, but he was injured just before the tournament.

In the 2000 AFC Asian Cup, Hong was selected for the All-Star Team, although South Korea failed to win the title by losing the semi-final match against Saudi Arabia.

Hong captained South Korea to a historic fourth-place finish in the 2002 FIFA World Cup. He scored the winning penalty to secure a 5–3 shoot-out victory after a goalless draw in the quarter-final match against Spain. The Technical Study Group voted Hong as the third best player of the tournament, giving the Bronze Ball to him. He became the first-ever Asian player to be named one of the top three players in a World Cup.

In that year, Hong ended his international career after a friendly match against World Cup champions Brazil as the all-time leader in appearances for South Korean national team.

Style of play
Hong didn't have rapid pace, untiring stamina or outstanding ability in man-to-man defense, but he possessed a wide field of vision as well as great leadership skills with which he marshalled his defensive partners. An offensive sweeper, he was noted for his accurate long-range passing skills which greatly contributed to South Korea's attack. He was nicknamed the "Eternal Libero" by the South Korean media, and became a preeminent icon of South Korean football during his era.

Managerial career
On 26 September 2005, after his retirement as a player, Hong returned to the national team as assistant coach. Helping the manager Dick Advocaat, he took part in the 2006 FIFA World Cup, and worked with the next manager Pim Verbeek in the 2007 AFC Asian Cup. After the resignation of Verbeek, he was one of the candidates to become the next manager.

The Korean FA announced that it had appointed him as the South Korea under-20 team, on 19 February 2009. Under his guidance the team reached the quarter-finals of the 2009 FIFA U-20 World Cup, but were eliminated due to a 3–2 defeat to Ghana, the eventual champions.

Hong also served an assistant coach for South Korea under-23 team under Park Sung-hwa. In October 2009, he took over the coaching duties at under-23 team. He led his team into third place in the 2010 Asian Games. On 10 August 2012, Hong Myung-bo coached the men's Olympic team to a 2–0 win over Japan to secure the bronze medal at the 2012 Summer Olympics, which set up a record by obtaining the first medal ever for South Korea in Olympic football as well as being the first Asian team in 44 years to win a medal at that event.

He was named as assistant manager to Guus Hiddink at Anzhi Makhachkala in August 2012. After Choi Kang-hee, the former head coach of South Korea, took the responsibility of the team's poor performance in 2014 FIFA World Cup qualification and resigned from his position, Hong Myung-bo was appointed as the new head coach of the team on 24 June 2013 to prepare the team for the 2014 FIFA World Cup. After a winless World Cup campaign, Hong resigned from his post on 10 July 2014.

On 24 December 2020, Hong was appointed as the head coach of Ulsan Hyundai.

Personal life
Hong married Cho Soo-mi, who was five years younger than him, in 1997. He has two sons, Hong Seong-min and Hong Jeong-min. One of them is currently attending Korea International School. Hong also has two younger siblings. Hong is known for his reticence and charisma.

Career statistics

Club

International
 
Results list South Korea's goal tally first.

Honours

Player
Sangmu FC
Korean Semi-professional League (Autumn): 1991

Pohang Steelers
Asian Club Championship: 1996–97
K League 1: 1992
Korean FA Cup: 1996
Korean League Cup: 1993

Kashiwa Reysol
J.League Cup: 1999

South Korea B
Summer Universiade: 1991

South Korea
FIFA World Cup fourth place: 2002
Asian Games bronze medal: 1990
AFC Asian Cup third place: 2000
Dynasty Cup: 1990

Individual
World XI: 1997
FIFA World Cup Bronze Ball: 2002
FIFA World Cup All-Star Team: 2002
FIFA 100: 2004
AFC Asian All Stars: 1993, 1997, 2000
AFC Asian Cup Team of the Tournament: 2000
AFC Hall of Fame: 2014
AFC Opta Best XI of All Time (FIFA World Cup): 2020
IFFHS Asian Men's Team of the Century: 1901–2000
IFFHS Asian Men's Team of All Time: 2021
K League 1 Most Valuable Player: 1992
K League 1 Best XI: 1992, 1994, 1995, 1996, 2002
K League 30th Anniversary Best XI: 2013
K League Hall of Fame: 2023
J.League Best XI: 2000

Manager
South Korea U23
Summer Olympics bronze medal: 2012
Asian Games bronze medal: 2010

Ulsan Hyundai
K League 1: 2022

Individual
K League 1 Manager of the Year: 2022

See also
 List of men's footballers with 100 or more international caps

Notes

References

External links

Hong Myung-bo at KFA 

International Appearances & Goals rsssf.com
Hong`s match winning goal　Jleague 2000 FC Tokyo vs Reysol

1969 births
Living people
Association football central defenders
South Korean footballers
South Korean expatriate footballers
South Korea international footballers
Pohang Steelers players
Shonan Bellmare players
Kashiwa Reysol players
LA Galaxy players
K League 1 players
K League 1 Most Valuable Player Award winners
J1 League players
Major League Soccer players
Expatriate footballers in Japan
Expatriate soccer players in the United States
1990 FIFA World Cup players
1994 FIFA World Cup players
1996 AFC Asian Cup players
1998 FIFA World Cup players
2000 AFC Asian Cup players
2000 CONCACAF Gold Cup players
2001 FIFA Confederations Cup players
2002 FIFA World Cup players
2014 FIFA World Cup managers
FIFA 100
FIFA Century Club
Footballers from Seoul
South Korean expatriate sportspeople in Japan
South Korean expatriate sportspeople in the United States
Association football sweepers
Korea University alumni
Major League Soccer All-Stars
South Korea national football team managers
South Korea national under-23 football team managers
South Korea national under-20 football team managers
Expatriate football managers in China
Zhejiang Professional F.C. managers
Ulsan Hyundai FC managers
Asian Games medalists in football
Footballers at the 1990 Asian Games
Footballers at the 1994 Asian Games
Asian Games bronze medalists for South Korea
Chinese Super League managers
Medalists at the 1990 Asian Games
South Korean expatriate football managers
Universiade gold medalists for South Korea
Universiade medalists in football